The following is a  list of results and scores from National Football League games aired on NFL on ABC.

ABC Monday Night Football

From 1970 to 2005, Monday Night Football aired exclusively on ABC.

ESPN Monday Night Football
Since the 2020 season, select Monday Night Football games have been simulcast on ABC. Since the 2021 season, ABC has simulcast the Week 18 Saturday doubleheader with ESPN. Beginning with the 2022 NFL season, ABC exclusively airs select Monday Night Football games.

2020 season

2021 season

2022 season

Wild Card Game
Since the 2016 playoffs, ESPN's coverage of NFL Wild Card Playoff game has been simulcast on ABC.

Pro Bowl

Since the 2018 Pro Bowl, ESPN's coverage of NFL Pro Bowl game has been simulcast on ABC.

See also
NFL on ABC
List of Monday Night Football results (1970–1989)
List of Monday Night Football results (1990–2009)
Monday Night Football

References

Simulcasts
ABC Sports
ESPN
National Football League on television results